The State Bank of Girard, at 105 E. Prairie in Girard, Kansas, was built in 1873.  It was listed on the National Register of Historic Places in 2009.

It was built in Italianate style and was modified c.1915 with Classical Revival-style changes.

References

Bank buildings on the National Register of Historic Places in Kansas
Italianate architecture in Kansas
Neoclassical architecture in Kansas
Commercial buildings completed in 1873
Crawford County, Kansas